Cucho is a hamlet and minor local entity located in the municipality of Condado de Treviño, in Burgos province, Castile and León, Spain. As of 2020, it has a population of 49.

Geography 
Cucho is located 99km east-northeast of Burgos.

References

Populated places in the Province of Burgos